Terry DeWayne Catledge (born August 22, 1963) is a former American professional basketball player. A 6'8" forward from the University of South Alabama, Catledge spent eight seasons (1985–1993) in the NBA as a member of the Philadelphia 76ers, Washington Bullets, and Orlando Magic. He ended his NBA career with 6,520 total points and 3,314 total rebounds.

Catledge attended the University of South Alabama and Itawamba Junior College in Mississippi.

His nephew Donald Tucker, Jr., was a three-year letterman on the football team and attended Mississippi State University from 1999 to 2003 and Tupelo High School from 1995 to 1999 in Tupelo, Mississippi. He later played for the semi-pro team Tupelo FireAnts before leaving the sport for good in 2008.

External links 
 

1963 births
Living people
African-American basketball players
American expatriate basketball people in Argentina
American expatriate basketball people in France
American expatriate basketball people in Greece
American men's basketball players
Aris B.C. players
Basketball players from Mississippi
Oklahoma City Cavalry players
Orlando Magic expansion draft picks
Orlando Magic players
People from Houston, Mississippi
Philadelphia 76ers draft picks
Philadelphia 76ers players
Power forwards (basketball)
Shreveport Crawdads players
Shreveport Storm players
South Alabama Jaguars men's basketball players
Washington Bullets players
21st-century African-American people
20th-century African-American sportspeople